Jim Crawley (born February 11, 1934) is a former American football coach.  He was the third head football coach at Frostburg State University in Frostburg, Maryland, serving for seven seasons, from 1968 to 1974, and compiling a record of 33–28–3.

References

1934 births
Living people
Frostburg State Bobcats football coaches